NA-166 Bahawalpur-III is a constituency for the National Assembly of Pakistan.

Members of Parliament

2018-2022: NA-174 Bahawalpur-V

Election 2002 

General elections were held on 10 Oct 2002. Makhdoom Zada Syed Ali Hassan Gillani of PML-Q won by 51,435 votes.

Election 2008 

General elections were held on 18 Feb 2008. Arif Aziz Sheikh of PPP won by 71,394 votes.

Election 2013 

General elections were held on 11 May 2013. Makhdoom Syed Ali Hassan Gillani of PML-N won by 61,891 votes and became the  member of National Assembly.

Election 2018 

General elections were held on 25 July 2018.

See also
NA-165 Bahawalpur-II
NA-167 Bahawalpur-IV

References

External links 
Election result's official website

NA-183